Herbert Justin Kneeshaw (1883–1955) was an English professional footballer who played as a goalkeeper. He made over 100 appearances for Cardiff City during a 12-year spell at the side and later became a coach at the club.

Career
Born in Beckhill, Kneeshaw has two spells for Bradford City (from 1903 to 1904, and from March 1907 to September 1909), and also played for Heaton, St Cuthbert's, Guiseley and Colne Town. During his time with Bradford City he made one appearance in the Football League. In 1912, Kneeshaw joined Southern Football League side Cardiff City after being spotted by manager Fred Stewart, making his debut for the club on the opening day of the 1912–13 season during a 1–1 draw against the club's South Wales rivals Swansea Town.

He quickly established himself as the first choice goalkeeper for the Bluebirds, playing in over 100 matches in the Southern Football League, a spell interrupted by the outbreak of World War I, and won the Second Division of the Southern Football League in his first season at Ninian Park. He remained with the club following their move into the Football League for the 1920–21 season, playing in their first ever Football League match during a 5–2 victory over Stockport County. However, midway through the season, he was displaced by Ben Davies and spent two seasons as backup, only appearing in a handful of matches for the club, before deciding to retire from the game following the arrival of Tom Farquharson. He instead took up a coaching position with the club and remained in the role for over a decade.

Honours
Cardiff City

Southern Football League Second Division winner: 1912–13

Sources

References

1883 births
1955 deaths
English footballers
Bradford City A.F.C. players
Guiseley A.F.C. players
Colne Town F.C. players
Cardiff City F.C. players
English Football League players
Southern Football League players
Association football goalkeepers